The following is the list of governors of Uttar Pradesh. The list also includes governors of the United Provinces of pre-independent India as well as Independent India from 15 August 1947 to 25 January 1950. The province was renamed Uttar Pradesh on 24 January 1950, and is headed by the governor of Uttar Pradesh.

Governors of United Provinces (1921–1950)

List of governors of Uttar Pradesh (1950–present)

See also
 Uttar Pradesh
 (1732–1857) – Nawabs of Awadh
 (1834–1836) – Governors of Agra
 (1836–1877) – Lieutenant Governors of the North-Western Provinces
 (1856–1877) – Chief Commissioners of Oudh
 (1877–1902) – Lieutenant Governors of the North-Western Provinces and Chief Commissioners of Oudh
 (1902–1921) – Lieutenant Governors of the United Provinces of Agra and Oudh
 (1921–1937) – Governors of the United Provinces of British India
 (1937–1950) – Governors of the United Provinces
 Chief Minister of Uttar Pradesh
 Governors of India

References

External links
 Provinces of British India
 The India List and India Office List By India Office, Great Britain
 http://upgovernor.gov.in/
Governors of the United Provinces

 
Uttar Pradesh
Governors